Highway 97C is an east-west highway, forming part of an important link between the Lower Mainland and the Okanagan Valley south of Kelowna, which is the third largest metropolitan area in the province. It bisects the Coquihalla Highway at Merritt. The expressway and freeway sections of the highway is known as Okanagan Connector or Coquihalla Connector.  The section of Highway 97C  between Highway 5 and Highway 97 is a core route of the National Highway System.

Route description 
Highway 97C begins near Peachland, at a trumpet interchange on Highway 97 known as Drought Hill. The road was formerly a  expressway and freeway sections have very few exits along its route. This stretch is a four-lane rural arterial highway.

Highways 97C and 8 travel along Nicola Avenue through Merritt and share a  concurrency to Lower Nicola, where Highway 8 continues west to Spences Bridge and Highway 97C diverges north. Highway 97C goes north for 42 km (26 mi) to Logan Lake, then northwest for 57 km (35 mi) to Ashcroft on the Canadian National Railway. Highway 97C then travels 6 km (4 mi) west from Ashcroft to where it converges with Highway 1, which takes Highway 97C north for its final 5 km (3 mi) to its end at Highway 97 in Cache Creek.

History 

Highway 97C was opened to traffic on October 1, 1990, and was constructed as the third phase of the Coquihalla Highway Project. It cost $225 million to construct (equivalent to $ million in  dollars).

In July 2007, the shared roadway of Highway 5A and 97C was upgraded to a two-lane road in each direction, the last segment required to enable two lanes in each direction when travelling between Vancouver and Kelowna. The upgrade was completed on July 24. 

When it was constructed, initial proposals had it designated as Highway 8; however, communities on the route preferred it designated as an auxiliary route of Highway 97, hence its Highway 97C designation.

Major intersections 
This table lists the exits on Route 97C from east to west.

References

External links
 Graph detailing the distance and altitude of the highway between Highway 5A and Highway 97 (via Pennask Summit)
 Official Numbered Routes in British Columbia

097C
Freeways in British Columbia
97C
Nicola Country
Highways in the Okanagan
Transport in Kelowna